Joseph Kumuondala Mbimba (1941 – March 6, 2016) was a Roman Catholic archbishop.

Ordained to the priesthood in 1969, Kumuondala Mbimba was named auxiliary bishop and then diocesan bishop of Bokunga-Ikela, Democratic Republic of the Congo, in 1982. In 1991, he was named archbishop of the Archdiocese of Mbandaka-Besunga. He died while still in office.

See also

Notes

1941 births
2016 deaths
20th-century Roman Catholic bishops in the Democratic Republic of the Congo
20th-century Roman Catholic archbishops in Africa
21st-century Roman Catholic archbishops in Africa
Roman Catholic bishops of Bokungu–Ikela
Roman Catholic archbishops of Mbandaka-Bikoro
21st-century Democratic Republic of the Congo people